Deminuibacter is a Gram-negative, aerobic and motile genus of bacteria from the family of Chitinophagaceae with one known species (Deminuibacter soli). Deminuibacter soli has been isolated from forest soil from the Dinghushan Biosphere Reserve in China.

References

Chitinophagia
Bacteria genera
Monotypic bacteria genera
Taxa described in 2019